KTLO may refer to:

 KTLO (AM), a radio station (1240 AM) licensed to serve Mountain Home, Arkansas, United States
 KTLO-FM, a radio station (97.9 FM) licensed to serve Mountain Home, Arkansas
 KTLO-LD, a low-power television station (channel 29, virtual 46) licensed to serve Colorado Springs, Colorado, United States